Nassarius clarus is a species of sea snail, a marine gastropod mollusk in the family Nassariidae, the Nassa mud snails or dog whelks.

Description
The length of the shell varies between 16 mm and 30 mm.

Distribution
This marine species occurs off Western Australia and in the Indian Ocean.

Ecology 
Nassarius clarus feeds on dead fishes and other carrion.
| name = Nassarius clarus

References

 Cernohorsky W.O. (1981). Revision of the Australian and New Zealand Tertiary and Recent species of the family Nassariidae (Mollusca: Gastropoda). Records of the Auckland Institute and Museum 18:137-192. 
 Cernohorsky W. O. (1984). Systematics of the family Nassariidae (Mollusca: Gastropoda). Bulletin of the Auckland Institute and Museum 14: 1-356. [

External links
 

Nassariidae
Gastropods described in 1877